Janko Tumbasević (born 14 January 1985) is a Montenegrin professional footballer who plays as a defensive midfielder for Serbian club Mladost Lučani.

Club career
Tumbasević made his senior debut with Zeta under manager Nikola Rakojević in the second half of the 2001–02 First League of FR Yugoslavia. He made over 100 league appearances for the club and won the 2006–07 Montenegrin First League, while captaining the side.

In August 2007, Tumbasević was transferred to Vojvodina, alongside Žarko Korać. He spent the following four years at the club, before moving to Moldova and joining Dacia Chișinău. In the first half of the 2012–13 season, Tumbasević was on loan at Zimbru Chișinău, before returning to Dacia Chișinău in early 2013.

In June 2016, Tumbasević signed with Mladost Lučani. He spent three seasons with the club, making 102 appearances and scoring 14 goals across all competitions. After two years at TSC Bačka Topola, Tumbasević returned to Mladost Lučani in June 2021.

International career
Tumbasević represented FR Yugoslavia at the 2002 UEFA European Under-17 Championship, as the team were eliminated in the quarter-finals by England, thanks to Wayne Rooney's goal. He also made one appearance for Serbia and Montenegro at under-21 level.

At full international level, Tumbasević earned four caps for Montenegro, making his debut in the country's inaugural match, a 2–1 home friendly win over Hungary on 24 March 2007.

Career statistics

Club

International

Honours
Zeta
 Montenegrin First League: 2006–07
Vojvodina
 Serbian Cup: Runner-up 2009–10, 2010–11
Mladost Lučani
 Serbian Cup: Runner-up 2017–18

Notes

References

External links
 
 
 

1985 births
Living people
Sportspeople from Šabac
Serbian people of Montenegrin descent
Serbia and Montenegro footballers
Montenegrin footballers
Association football midfielders
Serbia and Montenegro under-21 international footballers
Montenegro international footballers
FK Zeta players
FK Vojvodina players
FC Dacia Chișinău players
FC Zimbru Chișinău players
FK Spartak Subotica players
FK Mladost Lučani players
FK TSC Bačka Topola players
First League of Serbia and Montenegro players
Montenegrin First League players
Serbian SuperLiga players
Moldovan Super Liga players
Montenegrin expatriate footballers
Expatriate footballers in Moldova
Montenegrin expatriate sportspeople in Moldova